A parlour is a kind of room.

Parlour or parlor may also refer to:

Parlour music, type of popular music which, as the name suggests, is intended to be performed in the parlours of middle-class homes by amateur singers
Ray Parlour (born 1973), English footballer
Parlour (ice cream), by Nestlé
Parlor (film), 2014 horror film
The Parlour, opera 1966
The Parlor, an American music duo
Parlour Club, a venue in West Hollywood, California

See also 
Parler (disambiguation)